The Videos 1992–2003 is a DVD featuring all of the music videos released by the American third wave ska band No Doubt, between 1992 and 2003. It was released first in 2003 as the second disc of the Boom Box box set, and was the companion to the first disc in the set, The Singles 1992–2003. It was later released as a separate DVD on May 4, 2004 (see 2004 in music). The video has been certified gold in the United States.

Track list
"It's My Life"
"Running"
"Underneath It All" featuring Lady Saw
"Hella Good"
"Hey Baby" featuring Bounty Killer
"Bathwater"
"Simple Kind of Life"
"Ex-Girlfriend"
"New"
"Oi to the World!"
"Sunday Morning"
"Excuse Me Mr."
"Don't Speak"
"Spiderwebs"
"Just a Girl"
"Trapped in a Box"

Bonus features
"Don't Speak" (alternate version)
"Bathwater" (Invincible Overlord Remix)
"Video Conversation with No Doubt"

The DVD has been identified as a limited edition, which is quite rare to find.

References

No Doubt video albums
Music video compilation albums
2004 video albums
2004 compilation albums
Interscope Records compilation albums
Interscope Records video albums